Phlapphla is a khwaeng (subdistrict) of Wang Thonglang district, in Bangkok, Thailand. In 2020, it had a total population of 43,721 people.

References

Subdistricts of Bangkok
Wang Thonglang district